"The Witch" is a Russian fairy tale.  Andrew Lang included it in The Yellow Fairy Book. A version of the tale, under the title "The Twins and the Snarling Witch", appears in A Book of Witches by Ruth Manning-Sanders.

Synopsis
A poor widower with twin children, a girl and a boy, remarried. The stepmother had several more children and mistreated the twins. Finally, she told them she was sending them to her grandmother in the woods; she said they would have to serve her, but would be well rewarded. The girl said they should visit their own grandmother first. They did this and found that their grandmother knew the woman was a witch. She advised them to be civil and kind, and never touch a crumb belonging to anyone else, and gave them bread, milk and ham.

The witch set the girl to spin, and the boy to carry water in a sieve. The girl, who could not spin, wept.  Mice came up to her and asked for bread. She gave them some. They told her to give the cat ham, and it should show them a way from the woods; meanwhile, they would spin for her.  She went out, where her brother was trying to carry water. Wrens flew up and asked for some bread. They gave it, and the wrens advised him to stop up the holes with clay. They then gave the cat the ham.  It gave them a handkerchief and comb, which would become a river and a forest if they threw them behind them while they fled.

The next morning, the witch set the girl to weave, and the boy to chop wood into chips. Instead, they fled. A watch-dog sprung up, but they threw it the last of their bread. Birch trees nearly put out their eyes, but the girl tied a ribbon on their branches, and they let her by. Meanwhile, the cat was tangling the weaving, and when the witch saw it, she demanded to know why it had not stopped the children. It told her that she had never given it a bone, and they had given it ham.  The dog and the birch answered likewise, and she got her broom to follow.

The children threw down the handkerchief, but in time, the witch found a way to go around it. The children threw down the comb, and she could not force her way through it. They found their father again and he drove the stepmother out of the house.

External links
The Twins and the Snarling Witch

Female characters in fairy tales
Russian fairy tales
Witchcraft in fairy tales